Boardmasters Festival is an annual event held in Cornwall, United Kingdom, usually spanning five days on the second weekend of August. The event is a combination of live music and surfing/skateboarding competitions in and around the town of Newquay. The festival was founded in 1981 as a surfing competition, and in 2005 it was expanded to include music acts, taking place at Watergate Bay. The current capacity is 53,000.

The majority of the music performances take place to the north of Newquay near Watergate Bay. The Men's Pro 5 Star WQS surf competition takes place on Fistral Beach where a skate ramp is built for the BMX and Skateboard competitions. Other sporting events include The Women's Open, WSL Men's Longboard, WSL Women's Longboard, Boys/Girls Pro Junior and Under 12's. It also has a well-being program featuring aerial yoga, massages, wood-fired hot tubs and champagne.

The event is owned and managed by Vision Nine Group.

Music festival 
The Watergate Bay site hosts the music arena and all festival camping. The festival runs from Wednesday to Monday, with music performances running from Friday to Sunday across ten stages: The Main Stage, Unleashed, The Point, The Land Of Saints, Corona Sunsets, The View, The Netloft, The Dockyard, Keg & Pasty and the VIP Bar/Stage. Past years have seen performers such as Bastille, Faithless, Chase & Status, Snoop Dogg, The Chemical Brothers, Stormzy, Ed Sheeran, Deadmau5, George Ezra, Two Door Cinema Club, Calvin Harris, Catfish and the Bottlemen, Years and Years, Dizzee Rascal and Craig David. As well as music there is a variety of bars, stalls and fairground rides on the site, including a virtual reality hypercube.

Surf and skate 

At Fistral Beach the surf, BMX and skate competitions take place along with more music during the evenings. A small mini-ramp is set up on the headland and the vert ramp is built in the beach car park. A purpose built beach bar hosts more musical acts and evening beach sessions.

Professional surf competition winners

List of music headliners 

2021 
Friday 
Live Acts
Foals, Sam Fender, Lianne La Havas, Kano, Mahalia, Jade Bird, Kojey Radical, Georgia, Gabrielle Aplin, Holly Humberstone, Alfie Templeman, Olivia Dean, Karen Harding, Joesef, Lucy Spraggan, Billie Marten, Kam-Bu, Emma McGrath, Josh Barry, The Native, Sam Richardson & The Renegades 
DJs
Andy C, Eats Everything, Honey Dijon, Sonny Fodera, 2Shy MC, Barely Legal, Dixon Brothers, Ejeca, Franky Wah, Kettama, Madvilla, Majestic, Metrik, Mistajam, Shapes, Tonn Piper 
Saturday
Live Acts
Gorillaz, Loyle Carner, The Kooks, Becky Hill, Django Django, Young T & Bugsey, Ocean Wisdom, Ashnikko, Maisie Peters, Griff, Lady Leshurr, Inhaler, The Snuts, The Four Owls, Hollie Cook, Baby Queen, Chubby and The Gang, Eliza Shaddad, Andrew Cushin
DJs
Basement Jaxx (DJ set), CruCast (Bru-C, Darkzy, Kanine, Lazcru, MC Ad, Skepsis, Window Kid, Zero), Bklava, Charlie Boon, DJ Target, Ekkah, Gerd Janson, Paul Woodford, Rude Kid, Tiffany Calver, Tsha
Sunday
Live Acts
Jorja Smith, Jamie xx, Blossoms, slowthai, Beabadoobee, Arlo Parks, Maverick Sabre, Gentleman's Dub Club, The Big Moon, Allah-Las, Genaghr, GDC Soundsystem, Noisy, Will & The People, Jamie Webster, Respons
DJs
Maribou State (DJ set), Netsky, Sigala (live), Adelphi Music Factory, Charlie Hedges, Charlie Tee, Chris Lorenzo, Conducta, Crissy Criss, Folamour, Heléna Star, Jaguar Skills, James Hype, Jayda G, Just Kiddin, Lulah Francs, Phibes, Sherelle

2020 (Cancelled)

Friday
Skepta, The Kooks, Mura Masa, DJ EZ, Blossoms, Little Simz, Ocean Wisdom, Honey Dijon, Jeremy Loops, Easy Life, Hannah Wants, Kojey Radical, Jade Bird, Sports Team, Folamour, Prospa, Haai, Flava D, Miraa May, Conducta, Dan Shake, Jessica Winter, Caravana Sun, Tender Central, Aaron Smith, Bou, Ed Solo & Deekline, Tora, Dixon Brothers, Mollie Collins, Ekkah, Wuh Oh, Sean Koch, The Allergies, The Tribe, Andy Quick Band, Cakeboy, Penny Eyes, The Eyelids, Palooka 5, Lucy Gallant, Sadie Horler
Saturday
Kings Of Leon, Dizzee Rascal, Sam Fender, CamelPhat, Lianne La Havas, Basement Jaxx, Example, Maribou State, Palace, Elderbrook, Gabrielle Aplin, Allah-las, The Four Owls, Gerd Janson, Krystel Klear, Gengahr, Hollow Coves, Bad Sounds, DJ Boring, DJ Hype, Kawala, CC:Disco!, Feet, TC, AC13, Illyus & Barrientos, Stray Beast, Harriet Jaxxon, Riley Pearce, Alex The Astronaut, The Big Sets, The Barefoot Bandit, Sam Richardson, Zeb, Tribo Groove, Felon, Visionbi, Lulah Francs, O'Deus, Andrew Cushin, Bailey Tomkinson
Sunday
The 1975, Loyle Carner, Damian "JR Gong" Marley, Andy C, Mabel, Frank Carter & The Rattlesnakes, Hot Chip, Pale Waves, Hybrid Minds Outline, CruCast, Ghetts, The Big Moon, Palms Trax, Artwork, Beabadoobee, Gentlemen's Dub Club, Trevor Hall, Jayda G, Chaos in the CBD, Eva Lazarus, Sherelle, Lily Moore, Phibes, John, Bambara, Casey Lowry, Tay Oskee, Land of the Giants, Joe & The Shitboys, Finlay, DJ Proof, Hearing And Beige, Holly Humberstone

2019 (Cancelled)

Friday 
Main Stage – Wu-Tang Clan, Giggs, Razorlight, Mabel, SG Lewis, The Magic Gang, Ocean Alley, Josh Barry, Apre
Unleashed – DJ EZ, Ocean Wisdom, Problem Central, James Hype, Crissy Criss, Artful Dodger, DJ Jonezy
Land Of Saints – The Wombats, The Hunna, Bear's Den, Gabrielle Aplin, Sunset Sons, Bodega, Easy Life, Queen Zee, So Fresh So Clean
The Point – Claud Vonstroke, Richy Ahmed, Derrick Carter, Mella Dee, Todd Edwards, Jim Rider, Jamie Miller, Ryan Platts
Saturday
Main Stage – Florence + The Machine, Dizzee Rascal, Franz Ferdinand, Sam Fender, Lady Leshurr, Sinead Harnett, Sea Girls, Carvanna Sun, The Alive
Unleashed – Jax Jones & Martin Solveig, My Nu Leng, Elderbrook, Darkzy, Karen Harding, Shapes, Barely Legal, Cakeboy
Land Of Saints – Rudimental, Sleaford Mods, Ibibio Sound Machine, Mahalia, Self Esteem, Feet, Laurel, Hockeysmith, Dixon Brothers
The Point – Danny Howard b2b Paul Woolford & Rebuke, Artwork, Ross From Friends, Mele, Weiss, Prospa, Eli & Fur, Heidi
Sunday
Main Stage – Foals, Jorja Smith, Slaves, Michael Franti & Spearhead, Lewis Capaldi, House Gospel Choir, Grace Carter, Skeggs, Rayland Baxter, The Stalks
Unleased – Wilkinson b2b Sub Focus, Bugzy Malone, Flava D, Dimension, Nathan Dawe, DJ Proof
Land Of Saints – Plan B, Idles, Dermot Kennedy, Soak, Boy Azooga, Georgia, Cassia, Para Fiction, Boca 45
The Point – Mall Grab, Dennis Ferrer, Two Tribes, Mason Maynard b2b Eli Brown, The Menendez Brothers, Crawford, Bradley Zero, Jaguar
2018
Friday
Main Stage – Catfish and the Bottlemen, Kano, Miles Kane, Fun Lovin' Criminals, Raye, Has Baker, Samm Henshaw, Willie & The Bandits
Unleashed – MK, Stefflon Don, DJ Zinc B2B MJ Cole, Fred V & Grafix, Audio Bullys, Will Clarke, Light Layers
Land Of Saints – Everything Everything, Ash, The Amazons, Rae Morris, Kitty, Daisy and Lewis, Phil Taggart, Hockey Dad
The Point – Claptone, Idris Elba, Gene Farris B2B Doorly, OR:LA, Bronx Cheer, Ryan Platts
Saturday
Main Stage – The Chemical Brothers, Years & Years, Editors, MNEK, The Sherlocks, Isaac Gracie, Kele Okereke, Wildwood Kin, Newquay Male Voice Choir
Unleashed – Annie Mac, Shy FX, Riton & Kah-Lo, Kideko, Kelli-Leigh, Monki, Shapes, Cakeboy
Land Of Saints – Lily Allen, Feeder, Grandmaster Flash, Nadine Shah, Gengahr, Flyte, Balcony
The Point – Skream, Denis Sultra, Steve Lawler, Butch, Krystel Klear, Two Tribes, Haai
Sunday
Main Stage – George Ezra, Rag N Bone Man, Fat Freddy's Drop, Declan Mckenna, Becky Hill, Tom Walker, King Tuff, Mahalia, Stereo Honey
Unleashed – Craig David, Disciples, Nadia Rose, Holy Goof, Bobii Lewis, DJ Proof, Danny Howard
Land Of Saints – Friendly Fires, The Horrors, Songhoy Boys, Sam Fender, Confidence Man
The Point – Bicep, Booka Shade, Tiga, Dusky, Monki, Trance Wax, Shadow Child

2017
Friday
Main Stage – Two Door Cinema Club, The Flaming Lips, Frank Turner, Loyle Carner, Laura Mvula, Ten Tonnes, Ibibio Sound Machine
Unleashed – Andy C, Giggs, TQD, High Contrast, Phil Taggart, Light Layers, Joe Fox
Land Of Saints – DJ Shadow, Kurupt FM, Lower Than Alantis, Pulled Apart By Horses, Lucy Rose, Haunt The Woods
The Point – Roger Sanchez, Patrick Topping, Purple Disco Machine, Carly Foxx, Punctual, Luke Hassan
Saturday 
Main Stage – Jamiroquai, The Vaccines, Lethal Bizzle, Tom Grennan, Newton Faulkner, Raye, Will Joseph Cook
Unleashed – Gorgon City, Hannah Wants, Jax Jones, Icarus, Conducta, Mad Villains, Dextric
Land Of Saints – Jake Bugg, Slaves, Kate Nash, Jagwar Ma, Wild Beasts, Daisy Clark, Palace
The Point – Pete Tong, Idris Elba, Camelphat, Sonny Fodera, Yotto, Boo Seeka
Sunday
Main Stage – Alt-J, Stormzy, Ziggy Marley, JP Cooper, Becky Hill, Kiko Bun, Sam Fender, Dutch Uncles
Unleashed – Netsky, Armand Van Helden, Dub Pistols, Shapes, Tonn Piper, Star One, Saint Phnx 
Land Of Saints – Wretch 32, Fickle Friends, The Amazons, A Blaze of a Feather, Formation, Frances, Off Bloom
The Point – Solardo, Hot Since 82, T.Williams, Panda, Patrick Nazemi, Digital Farm Animals

2016
Friday
Main Stage – Chase & Status, Catfish and the Bottlemen, Lianne La Havis, Blossoms, Jack Savoretti, Nakho & Medicine for the People
Unleashed – Wilkinson, Krept & Konan, Danny Howard, Playground Zero, Nimmo, Light Layers
Land Of Saints – Wolf Alice, Maximo Park, Dinosaur Pile-Up, The Correspondents, Formation, Keir
The Point – Eats Everything, Bicep, Jonas Rathsman, Bodhi, Toucan, Carly Foxx, Drift, Danny Armstrong
Saturday 
Main Stage – Deadmau5, Kaiser Chiefs, Foxes, Protoje, Jamie Lawson, Michael Kiwanuka, Eliza & The Bear, The Steelers
Unleashed – Craig David, Kano, SG Lewis, Eton Messy, Icarus, Apres, Young Franco
Land Of Saints – Example + DJ Wire, Roots Manuva, Gabrielle Aplin, The Duke Spirit, The Mouse Outfit, Kloe, Joseph J Jones
The Point – Dusky, Heidi, Eli & Fur, Camelphat, Bronx Cheer, Tian Karl, Jac The Disco, RY Spenceley
Sunday
Main Stage – James Bay, Primal Scream, Soul II Soul, White Denim, Coasts, Rationale, The Magic Numbers, Vant, Hein Cooper
Unleashed – Sigma, Mike Skinner & Murkage, My Nu Leng, MNEK, Charlie Tee, DJ Proof  
Land Of Saints – Mystery Jets, Soak, Rat Boy, Raleigh Ritchie, The Big Moon, White Recreations, Tigerclub
The Point – Jackmaster, Detroit Swindle, Maribou State, Doorly, Artwork, Ben Remember, Jim Rider

2015

Friday
Main Stage – Faithless, Everything Everything, Nick Mulvey, Lower Than Atlantis, Circa Waves, Raleigh Ritchie, Reef, Sundara Karma
Unleashed – Roni Size, Fred V & Grafix, Blonde, 99 Souls, IS Tropical, Tora, Light Layers
Mavericks – Carl Barat & The Jackals, Fat White Family, The Wytches, Toy, Vant
 The Point – The Magician, Eton Messy, Fono, Kokiri, Jax Jones, Just Kiddin
Saturday
Main Stage – Rudimental, De La Soul, Seasick Steve, Rae Morris, MNEK, Rhodes, Rag N Bone Man, Plastic Mermaids
Unleashed – Julio Bashmore, DJ EZ, Apres, Lethal Bizzle, Astronomy, High Tyde
Mavericks – Drenge, Bo Ingen, The Strypes, God Damn, Yak, Declan Mckenna
The Point – T.Williams, Low Steppa, Icarus, Doorly, SG Lewis, FK Panda, Robin Parris
Sunday
Main Stage – Bastille, Clean Bandit, Arrested Development, Sunset Sons, Lucy Rose, Prides, Kim Churchill, Fickle Friends
Unleashed – Groove Armada, Skream, Crazy P, B.Traits, Maribou State
Mavericks – The Darkness, Pulled Apart By Horses, The Computers, Black Peaks, Axis Of, John Coffey, Wolf Note
The Point – Waze & Odyssey, Monki, Weiss, Grades, Lxury, Loose People, Drift

2014
Friday
Main Stage – Chase & Status, Mistajam, The Enemy, Dan Croll, Elli Ingram, Tom Vek, Saint Raymond, Ezra Vine, Isaiah Dreads
Unleashed – Shy FX, Roni Size, Meridian Dan, Stanton Warriors, Major Look, The Feud, Ryeland, Sinprint, Jello
Mavericks – Palma Violets, Yuck, Darlia, Big Deal, The Bohicas, Lyger, The Black Tambourines, Pastel Colours, The Bulletproof Bomb, Flashes
The Point – Friend Within, Jonas Rathsman B2B Isaac Tichauer, Eton Messy, Blonde, Bodhi, Kiri, Ben Remember, Bodean, Apres
Saturday
Main Stage – Snoop Dogg, Zane Lowe, The Cribs, The Cuban Brothers, Bipolar Sunshine, Lewis Watson, The Coronas, The Ramona Flowers, Current Swell
Unleashed – Duke Dumont, Wilkinson, Shift K3y, KNYTRO, Panda, Funeral Suits, Ry Spencely, Bat & Ball, Tiernan Locke & Sean Moyle
Mavericks – Dead Kennedys, Cerebral Ballzy, Decade, Coves, Southern, Life, Cut, Tides, Tom Gall
The Point – Ben Pearce, Kidnap Kid, Toyboy & Robin, My Nu Leng, Billion, Justin Harris, Bronx Cheer, Xy Constant, Adam Wyatt, Premise
Sunday (cancelled)
Main Stage – Bastille, Peace, George Ezra, Catfish and the Bottlemen, Boy & Bear, Raleigh Ritchie, We Were Evergreen, Amber Run, Sunset Sons, New Desert Blues
Unleashed – 2manydjs (DJ Set), Oneman, Goldierocks, MO, DJ Jonezy, Breton, DJ Proof, Antimatador, King Louie, Le Soso
Mavericks – Reel Big Fish, Blitz Kids, Jaws, Verses, Magnus Puto, Save Your Breath, Ghouls, Wolf Note, Pirate Copy, Patrons
The Point – DJ EZ, Monki, TCTS, Roska, The Golden Boy, One Bit, Rektchordz, Robin Paris, Ashley Thomas
Beach Sessions – Skindred, Jettblack, Boy Jumps Ship, Fink, Sunset Sons, Thomas J Speight

2013
Friday
Main Stage – The Vaccines, Everything Everything, Frightened Rabbit, The Other Tribe, Nina Nesbitt, Drenge, Ryan Keen, The Struts, Velcro Hooks, Hazards
Unleashed – Benga, Redlight, Mistajam, Friction, Ayar Marar, Majestic, Second City, Jello, Darko
Mavericks – We Are the Ocean, Dinosaur Pile Up, Tall Ships, The Physics House Band, Royal Blood, PJP Band, Dark Horses, I Am Giant, Gnarwolves, Bloody Knees, Honey, Week Night Thieves
The Point – Dusky, Bondax, Monki, Eton Messy, Discoguns, Adam Wyatt & Jim Rider, Alex Locke & Sean Moyle
Saturday
Main Stage – Basement Jaxx, Miles Kane, Delphic, Little Comets, Clean Bandit, Man Like Me, Ben Caplan, The Dexters, The Dedicated Nothing, Land of the Giants, 
Unleashed Stage – Simian Mobile Disco, Xxxy, Fenech Soler, Jakwob, Tom Staar, Jac The Disco, Ry Spencely, Jose Hugo, Ashley Thomas
Mavericks – Mallory Knox, Hawk Eyes, Brother & Bones, Crowns, Steve Smyth, The Sea, Dolomite Minor, Young Aviators, Rat Attack, Bad Channels
The Point – T.Williams, Gorgon City, Maribou State, Panda, Robin Paris, Ant Durkin, Luke Gledhill
Sunday
Main Stage – Ben Howard, The Joy Formidable, Tom Odell, Swim Deep, Hudson Taylor, Ahab, Story Books, Amber States, These Reigning Days
Unleashed – Grandmaster Flash, B.Traits ft MC Juma, CJ Beatz, Skints, Snatch The Wax, Breaks Collective, Kind Louie, Will Bailey
Mavericks – Temples, Little Barrie, The Virginmarys, The Computers, Wet Nuns, A Plastic Rose, Dancers, Great Cynics, Moriarty
The Point – MJ Cole, Copy Paste Soul, DEVolution, Justin Harris, Tim Nice, Piers Kirwan, Delux DJs

2012
Friday
Main Stage – Ed Sheeran, The Ting Tings, Donavno Frankenreiter, The Big Pink, The Jezabels, Sissy & The Blisters, Jake Bugg, Towns, Gabrielle Aplin, Gecko
Unleashed – DJ Fresh, Sway, Clement Marfo & The Frontline, Major Look, Snatch The Wax, Tim Nice, Deluxx DJs & Sax, Dante Gabriel, Robin Paris
Vans Stage – Pulled Part by Horses, While She Sleeps, Feed the Rhino, Hawk Eyes, Marmozets, Smoking Hearts, Great Cynics, Verses, As We Sink
Saturday
Main Stage – Dizzee Rascal, Maximo Park, Maverick Sabre, Delilah, Juan Zelada, Josh Kumra, Jenny O., Cut Ribbons, Lost Dawn
Unleashed – Zane Lowe, Doorly, NZ Shapeshifter, Krafty Kuts, The Beat Medics & Benny MC, Jac the Disco, Dancefloor Outlaws, Luke Gledhill, Ashley Thomas
Vans Stage – Set Your Goals, Futures, Turbowolf, Sharks, Eye Emma Jedi, Crowns, Exit Ten, Mixtapes, Eager Teeth, Hold the Sun, Kernuyck, Empire of Fools
Beach Sessions – Reel Big Fish, Xavier Rudd, The Black Seeds, The Skints, Aruba Red, Yes Sir Boss

2011
Friday
Main Stage – Klaxons, Bombay Bicycle Club, Eliza Doolittle, Benjamin Francis Leftwich, Friends Electric, Cloud Control, Yaaks, Flashguns, Pippa Marias, Brother and Bones
Relentless Stage – DJ Yoda, Gentlemans Dub Club, The Skints, Urban Knights, Back Beat Soundsystem, DJ Natty, Solo Collective DJs
Vans Stage – KIGH DJ Set, Skindred, Twin Atlantic, Francesqa, Crazy Arm, Straight Lines, Bangers, Veils, Suitnoir
Saturday
Main Stage – Fat Boy Slim, Sub Focus, Zane Lowe, Stereo MC's, Easy Star Allstars, Ben Howard, Willy Mason, Maverick Sabre, Dub the Earth, Lori Campbell, Crowns
Relentless Stage – Qemists, Lethal Bizzle, Art Brut, Wolf Gang, More Diamonds, The Violet May, I Am Harlequin, Spree, Solo Collective, DJ Natty

2010
Friday
Main Stage – Newton Faulkner, Seastick Steve, Xaver Rudd, Plan B, Tinie Tempah, Alan Pownall, Lisa Mitchell, Goldhawks, Peggy Sue, Thomas Ford
Relentless Stage – Charlie G, Gallows, Rolo Tomassi, Dwarves, TGOAT, Devil Sold His Soul, The Chapman Family, Japanese Voyeurs, Turbowolf, Sometime Never, The James Cleaver Quintet
Vans Stage – Kristoff, We Are The Ocean, Trash Talk, The Computers, Chickenhawk, Casino Brawl, Sharks, Lower Than Atlantis, Goodtime Boys, Cerebral Ballzy, March of the Raptors, Crocus, Rash Decision
Saturday
Main Stage – Leftfield, Chase & Status, Example, French Horn Rebellion, Ou Est Le Swimming Pool, Fenech Soler, Boy Who Trapped The Sun, Matthew P, Fishermans Friends, Three Minute Warning
Relentless Stage – Klimax & Benny MC, Chase & Status (DJ Set), New Young Pony Club, Crystal Fighters, Crazy P, Punks Jump Up, Urban Knights, The Cheek, Sound of Guns, Morning Parade, Teenagersintokyo, The Wild
Vans Stage – Jon Kennedy, Madina Lake, Young Guns, Failsafe, Little Fish, Paris Riots, Cars on Fire, White Belt Yellow Tag, Jettblack, Everything Burns, The Sum Of, WFFTS, Ape
Beach Sessions – The Futureheads, Zero 7 (DJ Set), Natty, Ben Howard, Reverend SS

2009
Friday
Main Stage – The Streets, Calvin Harris, Roots Manuva, The King Blues, Ash Grunwald, Master Shortie, Gold Teeth, Cosmo Jarvis, Rob Sawyer
Boardmasters Relentless Stage – Kissy Sell Out, Freeland, Pete & The Pirates, Fionn Regan, Sky Larkin, Wallis Bird, The Sea, Party Horse, The Answering Machine, The Boy Who Trapped in the Sun, 
Vans Stage – Brakes, Xcerts, Dinosaur Pile Up, Failsafe, This City, Jettblack, Telegraphs, Crazy Arm, Gentlemen's Pistols, Suit Noir, San Pablo, 
Saturday
Main Stage – Cypress Hill, Supper Furry Animals, Dan le Sac, Dreadzone, Will and the People, Ben Howard, Tristan Prettyman, Max Tuohy, Back Beat Soundsystem
Boardmasters Relentless Stage – Pendulum (DJ Set), Filthy Dukes, Tommy Sparkes, James Yuill, Fanfarlo, Chew Lips, Haunts, Rosie & The Goldbug, Pete Lawrie
Vans Stage – Ghost of a Thousand, Pulled Apart By Horses, The Plight, Outcry Collective, Hexes, The Computers, Sharks, Turbowolf, White Man Kamikaze, Don Broco, Everything Burns
Beach Sessions – The Blackout, We Are The Ocean, Pete Murray, Ben Howard, Sneaky Sound System, Jelly Jazz

2008
Friday
Main Stage – Groove Armada, The Zutons, Audio Bullys, Morcheeba, Natty, The Black Seeds, Yoav, Beau Young, Jersey Budd
Second Stage – Mystery Jets, The Holloways, Haunts, Sam Issaac, Jeremy Walmsley, Jersey Budd, Bookhouse Boys, The Locarnos, Rosie & The Goldbug
Saturday
Main Stage – The Pigeon Detectives, The Futureheads, Reverend & The Makers, Glas Vegas, The Young Knives, The Rifles, The Displacements, Red Light Company, Sam Isaac, Astro Firs
Second Stage – Gallows, Ghost of a Thousand, Johnny Truant, In Case of Fire, Slaves to Gravity, Hexes, Fighting With Wire, Skirtbox, Lioness

2007
Friday
Main Stage – Paolo Nutini, Guillemots, Ben Taylor, Matt & Kim, Saving Aimee
Second Stage – The Subways, Enjoy Destroy, Angus & Julia Stone, Reuben, The Future
Saturday
Main Stage – Ash, Newton Faulkner, Funeral for a Friend, Hayley Sales, Ruarri Joseph
Second Stage – Scott Matthews, Fightstar, Palladium, Kids in Glass Houses, The Blackout

2006
Acts Performing at the Beach Sessions
Friday – Feeder
Saturday – Starsailor

2005
Acts performing at the Beach Sessions
Friday – James Blunt, Donavon Frankenreiter
Saturday – Razorlight, Rooster

Cancellations
In 2014, the organisers of the festival were forced to cancel the final day at the Watergate Bay site due to the remnants of Hurricane Bertha. Artists due to perform were Bastille, George Ezra, Reel Big Fish, DJ EZ, 2manydjs and Catfish and the Bottlemen. However, the surf competition at Fistral Beach continued as normal and full refunds for the cancelled day were received by customers.

The 2019 event was also cancelled hours before it was due to take place, after serious concerns of bad weather forecast to disrupt the event.

Boardmasters was then cancelled for a second year in a row in 2020, due to the COVID-19 pandemic.

Award nominations
Boardmasters was nominated for ‘Best Medium Sized Festival’ at the 2014 UK Festival Awards, alongside Secret Garden Party, Camp Bestival, and winners We Are FSTVL.

References

External links

Boardmasters Festival Website
See Tickets Boardmasters Website
Vision Nine Group Events

Newquay
Tourist attractions in Cornwall
Music festivals in Cornwall
Surfing competitions